The Nigerian National Assembly delegation from Zamfara comprises three Senators representing Zamfara West, Zamfara Central, and Zamfara North, and seven Representatives representing   Bakura/Maradun, Gummi/Bukkuyum, Bungudu/Maru, Kaura Namoda/Birnin Magaji, Tsafe/Gusau, Zurmi/Shinkafi, and Anka/Mafara.

Fourth Republic

9th Assembly (2019 - 2023)

6th Assembly (2007 - 2015)

4th Assembly (1999 - 2003)

References
Official Website - National Assembly House of Representatives (Zamfara State)
 Senator List

Zamfara State
National Assembly (Nigeria) delegations by state